Konnex Records is a German jazz record label founded in 1984. Record producer Manfred Schiek, who had previously run the label Vinyl Records, founded the label in Berlin to issue contemporary jazz recordings from British and continental European performers. In the 1990s the label expanded into reissues of music by Elvin Jones and Cecil Taylor. Konnex operates a sublabel, Atonal, for electronic music.

Roster
 
Antonis Anissegos
Borah Bergman
Toto Blanke
John Blum
Thomas Borgmann
Joanne Brackeen
Anthony Braxton
Rob van den Broek
Peter Brötzmann
Christy Doran
Lajos Dudas
Gerd Dudek
Kim Efert
European Jazz Ensemble
Alvin Fielder
Joe Fonda
Sonny Fortune
Joel Futterman
Dennis Gonzalez
Dick Griffin
Ali Haurand
Allan Holdsworth
Carl Ludwig Huebsch
Ken Hyder
Theo Joergensmann
Elvin Jones
Kidd Jordan
Achim Kaufmann
Franklin Kiermyer
Klaus Lenz
Holger Mantey
Charlie Mariano
Henriette Mueller
Zbigniew Namyslowski
Pascal Niggenkemper
Tony Oxley
Jon Rose
Ingrid Sertso
Christoph Spendel
John Stevens
Jiri Stivin
Cecil Taylor
Keith Tippett
David Tudor
Felix Wahnschaffe
Trevor Watts
Art Zoyd

References

German record labels
Jazz record labels